The First cabinet of Jules Dufaure was the 54th cabinet of France and the second of the Third Republic, seating from 19 February 1871 to 18 May 1873, headed by Jules Dufaure as Vice-President of the Council of Ministers and Minister of Justice, under the presidency of Adolphe Thiers.

History 

The Government of National Defence, having led the republic during the Franco-Prussian War, signed the Armistice of Versailles which provided for new elections in the National Assembly to establish a more legitimate government.

The cabinet was formed following the Legislative elections of 1871, which saw a majority of royalists elected. Their initial project was a third Restoration of descendants of either the Bourbons or the Orléans; the Republic was merely seen at that time by royalists as a system of transition before the return of a constitutional monarchy.

However, Jules Dufaure succeeded in assembling a coalition of Opportunists, Legitimists, Orleanists and independent Liberals, while leaving Bonapartists, marginalized following the fall of the Second Empire, and Radicals, openly in favour of the pursuit of the war, out of the majority.

On 18 May 1873, Adolphe Thiers, wishing to reorganize the government and to make it more republican leaning, asked the cabinet to resign and tasked Jules Dufaure to form a new one, leading to the formation of the Cabinet Dufaure II.

Actions 
The main actions of the government were to deal with the Paris Commune and to end the Franco-Prussian War by conducting negotiations with Bismarck before signing the Treaty of Frankfurt and reducing the indemnity requested by Prussia to five billion francs.

It also supervised the reorganization of the French Army in order to provide it with manpower equivalent to that of the Prussian Army and to professionalize it, and finally dissolved the National Guard now seen as a major threat to the republic and the regular army.

Composition

Notes

References

French Third Republic
Cabinets established in 1871
Cabinets disestablished in 1873
1871 in France